Tony Pierce-Roberts, BSC (born 1945 in Birkenhead, England) is a British cinematographer most known for his work on the Merchant-Ivory film productions, A Room with a View (1986), Mr. and Mrs. Bridge (1990), Howards End (1992), and The Remains of the Day (1993). He received two Academy Award nominations for A Room with a View and Howards End.

Filmography

Film

Television

Awards and nominations

References

External links

1945 births
English cinematographers
Living people
People from Birkenhead